The West Asian Basketball Super League 2006 (WASL) was the 1st staging of the WASL League, the basketball club league of West Asia Basketball Association. The top four teams from different countries qualify for the FIBA Asia Champions Cup 2006.

Preliminary round

Group A

Group B

Knockout round
{{8TeamBracket
| sets = 3/3/5/3
| RD1=Quarterfinals
| RD2=Semifinals
| RD3=Final
| 3rd=3rd place
| score-width=28
| team-width=160
| RD1-seed1=B1
| RD1-team1= Saba Battery
| RD1-seed2=A4
| RD1-team2= Al-Jaish
| RD1-score1-1=91
| RD1-score2-1=90
| RD1-score1-2=80
| RD1-score2-2=77
| RD1-score1-3=171
| RD1-score2-3=167
| RD1-seed3=A2
| RD1-team3= Aramex
| RD1-seed4=B3
| RD1-team4= Blue Stars
| RD1-score3-1=85
| RD1-score4-1=90
| RD1-score3-2=81
| RD1-score4-2=83
| RD1-score3-3=166
| RD1-score4-3=173
| RD1-seed5=A1
| RD1-team5= Sagesse
| RD1-seed6=B4
| RD1-team6= Fastlink
| RD1-score5-1=83
| RD1-score6-1=71
| RD1-score5-2=89
| RD1-score6-2=86
| RD1-score5-3=172
| RD1-score6-3=157
| RD1-seed7=B2
| RD1-team7= Al-Jalaa
| RD1-seed8=A3
| RD1-team8= Sanam
| RD1-score7-1=79
| RD1-score8-1=80
| RD1-score7-2=86
| RD1-score8-2=75
| RD1-score7-3=165
| RD1-score8-3=155
| RD2-seed1=B1
| RD2-team1= Saba Battery
| RD2-seed2=B3
| RD2-team2= Blue Stars
| RD2-score1-1=89
| RD2-score2-1=81
| RD2-score1-2=74
| RD2-score2-2=77
| RD2-score1-3=87
| RD2-score2-3=86
| RD2-seed3=A1
| RD2-team3= Sagesse
| RD2-seed4=B2
| RD2-team4= Al-Jalaa
| RD2-score3-1=82
| RD2-score4-1=88
| RD2-score3-2=72
| RD2-score4-2=68
| RD2-score3-3=20
| RD2-score4-3=0
| RD3-seed1=B1
| RD3-team1= Saba Battery
| RD3-seed2=A1
| RD3-team2= Sagesse
| RD3-score1-1=80
| RD3-score2-1=78
| RD3-score1-2=67
| RD3-score2-2=99
| RD3-score1-3=81
| RD3-score2-3=84
| RD3-score1-4=20
| RD3-score2-4=0
| RD3-score1-5=x
| RD3-score2-5=x
| 3rd-seed1=B3
| 3rd-team1= Blue Stars
| 3rd-seed2=B2
| 3rd-team2= Al-Jalaa
| 3rd-score1-1=87
| 3rd-score2-1=90
| 3rd-score1-2=75
| 3rd-score2-2=81''
| 3rd-score1-3=—
| 3rd-score2-3=—
}}

QuarterfinalsGame 1Game 2Game 3Game 4SemifinalsGame 1Game 2'''

3rd place

Final

External links
www.goalzz.com

2006
2005–06 in Asian basketball leagues
2005–06 in Jordanian basketball
2005–06 in Iranian basketball
2005–06 in Lebanese basketball
2006 in Syrian sport
2006 in Iraqi sport